The Shadow Ministry of Bill Hayden was the opposition Australian Labor Party shadow ministry of Australia from 29 December 1977 to 3 February 1983, opposing Malcolm Fraser's Coalition ministry.

The shadow cabinet is a group of senior Opposition spokespeople who form an alternative cabinet of Australia, the members of which shadow or mark each individual minister or portfolio of the government.

Bill Hayden became Leader of the Opposition upon his election as leader of the Labor Party on 22 December 1977, and his first shadow cabinet was appointed. A second, rearranged shadow cabinet led by Hayden was appointed after Labor lost the 1980 election.

Shadow Ministry (1977-1980)
The following were members of the shadow cabinet from 29 December 1977 to 7 November 1980:

Shadow Ministry (1980-1983)
The following were members of the Shadow Cabinet:

See also
 Shadow Ministry of Gough Whitlam (1975–77)
 Shadow Ministry of Bob Hawke
 Third Fraser ministry
 Fourth Fraser ministry

References

Australian Labor Party
Hayden
Opposition of Australia